Hana Truncová (23 August 1924, Teplice – 7 April 2022, Skuteč) was a political prisoner of Czech-German descent.

Biography
Born in Czechoslovakia, she was the oldest member of the editorial board of the Krušnohorské noviny (Erzgebirgs-Zeitung) and a witness to their historical editorial office, which worked in Teplice-Šanov until 1943 under the guidance of professor Dr. Gustav Müller.

References

1924 births
2022 deaths
Czech women journalists
Czechoslovak journalists
Czechoslovak prisoners and detainees
Czech people of German descent
People from Teplice